Shasta Ventures is an early-stage venture capital investment firm located in Silicon Valley that invests in enterprise and technology consumer startups. It is located on Sand Hill Road in Menlo Park.

Funds
Shasta's second fund of US$250 million included Nest Labs, which almost all by itself repaid the entire fund when it was sold to Google for $3.2 billion. Shasta's third fund of $265 million was announced in September 2011. The fourth fund, of $300 million, was announced in June 2014.

Investment philosophy
Shasta was originally focused on companies in the consumer technology space, with then managing director Tod Francis calling Mint.com a "classic Shasta" investment in September 2011.

In September 2013, Rob Coneybeer of Shasta, the new managing director, said that he was betting big on hardware startups, citing Moore's Law-style continued performance improvements making opportunities for new hardware possible.

Companies

Mint.com
Shasta Ventures was an early investor in Mint.com, an online personal finance management service that was bought in September 2009 by financial software company Intuit for US$170 million in cash. An article by Alexia Tsotsis for TechCrunch quoted Shasta's managing director Tod Francis as using the phrase "Classic Shasta" to describe Shasta's investment in Mint.com.

Nest Labs
Shasta Ventures and Kleiner Perkins Caufield & Byers were the only investors in the Series A round for Nest Labs (the home automation company) in September 2010. When Google later bought Nest Labs for US$3.2 billion in January 2014, Shasta had a net gain of about $200 million, enough to pay out "almost all" of the $250 million Shasta II fund.

Other investments
Shasta has invested in a number of other companies such as Anaplan, Brandcast, Entelo, Leanplum, Nextdoor, Lithium Technologies, Logoworks, Zuora, Tally Technologies, Spiceworks, Stealth Security, and VoloMetrix.

Controversy 
In August 2019 partner Doug Pepper left the firm, potentially triggering a "key-man" event

References

External links
 

Financial services companies established in 2004
Venture capital firms of the United States